Star of Jupiter is Kurt Rosenwinkel's tenth album as a band leader.  This album includes a new band and is Rosenwinkel's first quartet album since The Next Step (2001). The album includes mostly new songs with a remake of an old composition, "A Shifting Design". A review at All About Jazz called the album "a contemporary classic." Transcriptions of the album by Denin Koch have been published by Mel Bay.

Track listing
All pieces by Kurt Rosenwinkel.

Disc 1:
 "Gamma Band" – 7:03
 "Welcome Home" – 4:46
 "Something, Sometime" – 6:21
 "Mr. Hope" – 5:30
 "Heavenly Bodies" – 11:25
 "Homage A'Mitch" – 7:47

Disc 2:
 "Spirit Kiss" – 8:39
 "kurt1" – 6:51
 "Under It All" – 7:27
 "A Shifting Design" – 5:59
 "Deja Vu" – 10:54
 "Star of Jupiter" – 8:58

Personnel

Kurt Rosenwinkel – guitar and vocals
Aaron Parks – piano
Eric Revis – bass
Justin Faulkner – drums

References 

2012 albums
Kurt Rosenwinkel albums